Gattya is a genus of hydroids in the family Halopterididae.

The genus name of Gattya is in honour of Margaret Gatty (née Scott, 1809–1873), who was an English children's author and writer on marine biology.

The genus was circumscribed by William Henry Harvey in Trans. Roy. Irish Acad. Vol. 22 (Edition 5, Sci.) on page 555 in 1855.

Species
The following species are classed in the genus Gattya:
Gattya aglaopheniaformis (Mulder & Trebilcock, 1909)
Gattya balei (Bartlett, 1907)
Gattya conspecta (Billard, 1907)
Gattya heurteli (Billard, 1907)
Gattya humilis Allman, 1885
Gattya multithecata (Jarvis, 1922)
Gattya trebilcocki Watson, 1973
Gattya tropicalis Millard & Bouillon, 1973
Gattya wimleni Gravier-Bonnet, 1998

References

Halopterididae
Hydrozoan genera